Blackwall is a neighbourhood within Chuwar in the City of Brisbane, Queensland Australia. It probably takes its name from the nearby cliff alongside the Brisbane River known as The Blackwall.

References 

Populated places in Queensland
City of Brisbane